The Antelope County Courthouse, in Neligh in Antelope County, Nebraska, was built in 1894.  It was listed on the National Register of Historic Places in 1980.  As of 1980, it was one of the oldest courthouses still in use in Nebraska.

Neligh, founded in 1873, eventually won out over Oakdale, Nebraska as county seat, and county offices were moved to rented buildings in Neligh in 1883.  The building was designed by George E. MacDonald of Lincoln, Nebraska, but the plans were found to be incomplete, and Fred Thornton of Neligh completed the drawings. Construction by contractor J. N. Mills started on August 2, 1894 and was completed January 11, 1985.

The tower was supported by arched trusses. The tower was removed in 1964, while the pyramids remain. County clerk, treasurer, and other county offices were moved to a separate annex building built in 1966, while the courthouse remained in the original building.

References

External links

Courthouses on the National Register of Historic Places in Nebraska
Government buildings completed in 1895
County courthouses in Nebraska
National Register of Historic Places in Antelope County, Nebraska